Nancy Burr Deloye Fitzroy (born October 5, 1927) is an American engineer specializing in heat transfer and fluid dynamics. She was one of the first female helicopter pilots.

Early life and education
Born Nancy Burr Deloye in Pittsfield, Massachusetts, she became the first female student to study chemical engineering at the Rensselaer Polytechnic Institute, graduating with a bachelor's degree in 1949.

Career 
Hired by Knolls Atomic Power Laboratory in 1950, she worked as an assistant engineer with the heat transfer group. In 1952, she became a development engineer for General Electric, initially working on the Hermes Missile Program and designing heat transfer surfaces for nuclear reactor cores. Nancy would remain with the General Electric company for the next 37 years. There she met her future husband, electrical engineer Roland Victor Fitzroy, Jr.; the couple were married in 1951.

Nancy specialized as a heat transfer engineer with the Advanced Technology Laboratories beginning in 1963. In 1965 she was a heat transfer consultant with the Research and Development Center, working on gas turbines, space satellites and other technologies. She was appointed editor of the GE heat transfer and fluid flow data books, a reference work that was made available by subscription to engineers world-wide beginning in 1970.

During the 1970s, Nancy turned to administrative and management roles. She was named manager for heat transfer consulting in 1971, a strategic planner from 1974 to 1976, then an advanced concepts planner and proposal manager up to 1979. During 1979–1982 she was a manager of energy and environmental programs with GE's Turbine Market and Projects Division. Thenceforth she worked as a consultant involved with gas turbines, nuclear energy, and space vehicles. From June 1986–87 she became the first female president of the American Society of Mechanical Engineers—the first woman to head a major national engineering society. She retired in 1987.

Nancy Fitzroy was one of the first female helicopter pilots, and both she and her husband enjoyed flying, sailing and traveling. The Nancy DeLoye Fitzroy and Roland V. Fitzroy Medal was established in 2011 by the American Society of Mechanical Engineers to "pioneering contribution to the frontiers of engineering leading to a breakthrough(s) in existing technology or leading to new applications or new areas of engineering endeavor". Nancy serves as chair for the committee that selects the recipients.

Awards and honors
 Achievement Award, Society of Women Engineers (1972)
 Demers Medal, Rensselaer Polytechnic Institute (1975)
 Davies Medal, Rensselaer Polytechnic Institute (2014)
 Centennial Medal, American Society of Mechanical Engineers (1980)
 Federation of Professional Women Award (1984)
 Honorary Fellow, Institution of Mechanical Engineers (1987)
 Elected to the National Academy of Engineering (1996)
 Rensselaer Polytechnic Institute Hall of Fame (1999)
 Honorary Membership Award, American Society of Mechanical Engineers (2008)
 Honorary Doctorate in Engineering, Rensselaer Polytechnic Institute
 Honorary Doctor of Science Degree, New Jersey Institute of Technology

Bibliography
 GE heat transfer and fluid flow data books (1955–1974)
 Career guidance for women entering engineering (1973)

References

External links
 
 
 

1927 births
People from Pittsfield, Massachusetts
Rensselaer Polytechnic Institute alumni
American women engineers
General Electric people
Presidents of the American Society of Mechanical Engineers
Living people
20th-century American engineers
Members of the United States National Academy of Engineering
American chemical engineers
Fellows of the Institution of Mechanical Engineers
20th-century women engineers
21st-century women engineers
20th-century American women
21st-century American women